Venicile Vyapari, is a 2011 Indian Malayalam-language Action-romantic comedy film directed by Shafi, starring Mammootty, Kavya Madhavan and Poonam Bajwa. The film's plot unfolds in Alappuzha, a town in Kerala popularly known as the Venice of the East. Written by James Albert, the story follows a murder mystery.

Plot
The story revolves around Pavithran, who lost his parents in his childhood. He enters the police force by chance, though it is not his ambition to do so. Pavithran lands up in Alappuzha (Alappuzha incidentally is attributed to the sobriquet, Venice of the East) disguised as a merchant to investigate the murder of a union leader named Ajayan. Another character is Ammu, who is the leader of the union of coir workers and is in love with Pavithran.

Cast 
 Mammootty as Pavithran
 Kavya Madhavan as Ammu
 Poonam Bajwa as Mahalakshmi
 Suraj Venjaramoodu as Chandran Pillai / Odiyan Chandhu
 Jagathy Sreekumar as Kaladi Govindan
 Salim Kumar as Kamalasanan / Al-Kamalasanan
 Vijayaraghavan as Chungathara Raghavan
 Suresh Krishna as Chungathara Aniyappan
 Biju Menon as Sakhavu Ajayan (Cameo role)
 Janardhanan as SP Raghurama Varma
 Guinness Pakru as Kochukrishnan
 V. K. Sreeraman as Aali Koya
 Abu Salim as Abdu
 Kalabhavan Shajohn as Panchayat President Isthiri Lonappan
 Kundara Johny as CI K. Nambeesan
 Santhosh
 Anjali Nair as Ammu's friend
 Saju Kodiyan as Police Constable

Production
The film was produced by Madhavan Nair under the banner of Murali Films. Mammootty stars in the film with Vijayaraghavan, Jagathy Sreekumar, Salim Kumar, Suraj Venjaramoodu, Sreeraman, Kalabhavan Shajohn, Rajan Padoor form the supporting cast.

Shooting commenced in August 2011, and the film was mostly shot from Alappuzha. The song "Kannum Kannum" was shot in Ooty.

The film was scheduled to release on 4 November 2011, but was postponed to 11 November 2011 since there was a delay in the post production work of the film. Release was postponed again to 16 December 2011 due to a film strike in Kerala.

Reception
Sify movies gave the film a rating of 2.5/5, criticising the script.

Music
Bijibal composed the music for the film, which has lyrics by Kaithapram. The film has a remix of the song "Kannum Kannum" from the 1980 film Angadi. Mammootty stated that it was the desire of the director Shafi to use a hit song of the eighties in a dream scene of the film.

References

2011 films
2011 romantic comedy films
Films shot in Alappuzha
Films shot in Ooty
2010s Malayalam-language films
Films directed by Shafi